Canadian recording artist PartyNextDoor has released three studio albums, five extended plays, and eighteen singles (including seven as a featured artist).

Studio albums

EPs

Singles

As lead artist

As featured artist

Other charted songs

Guest appearances

Production discography

2012 
Ty Dolla $ign – Beach House
 07. "Mi$$ion"

2013 
PartyNextDoor – PartyNextDoor
 01. "Welcome to the Party"
 02. "Wild Bitches"
 03. "Relax with Me"
 04. "Right Now"
 05. "Make a Mil"
 06. "Break from Toronto"
 07. "TBH"
 08. "Wus Good / Curious"
 09. "Over Here" (featuring Drake)
 10. "Ballin'"

2014 
PartyNextDoor – PartyNextDoor Two
 01. "East Liberty"
 02. "SLS" (co-produced by G. Ry)
 04. "Her Way"
 05. "Belong to the City"
 06. "Grown Woman" (co-produced by Neenyo)
 07. "FWU"
 08. "Recognize" (featuring Drake)
 09. "Options"
 10. "Thirsty"
 11. "Bout It"
 12. "Muse"

PartyNextDoor – Colours
 01. "Let's Get Married" (co-produced by G. Ry)
 02. "Girl from Brathwaite Okland" 
03. "Jus Know"  (featuring Travis Scott) (co-produced by WondaGurl)

 04. "Don't Worry" (featuring Cash Out) (co-produced by Cardo and Yung Exclusive)

2015 
Drake – If You're Reading This It's Too Late
 01. "Legend"
 09. "Preach" (featuring PartyNextDoor)
 10. "Wednesday Night Interlude" (featuring PartyNextDoor)

Big Sean – Dark Sky Paradise
 13. "Deserve It" (featuring PartyNextDoor)

2016 
Rihanna – Anti
04. "Work" (featuring Drake) (co-produced by Boi-1da, Kuk Harrell and 40)
16. "Sex with Me" (co-produced by Boi-1da, Frank Dukes, Vinylz and 40)

PartyNextDoor – PARTYNEXTDOOR 3
01. "High Hopes"
03. "Nobody"
08. "Temptations"
09. "Spiteful"
10. "Joy" (co-produced by 40 and Neenyo)
11. "You've Been Missed" (co-produced by FWDSLXSH, Neenyo and Bizness Boi)
12. "Transparency" (co-produced by Neenyo and Bizness Boi)
13. "Brown Skin" (co-produced by 40)
14. "1942"
16. "Nothing Easy to Please" (co-produced by 40)

Usher – Hard II Love
05. "Let Me"

Rich the Kid – Trap Talk
13. "Routine Rouge"(featuring Rich the Kid, Ty Dolla Sign)

2017 
DJ Khaled – Grateful
02. "Shining" (featuring Beyoncé and Jay Z) (co-produced by Danja)
04. "Wild Thoughts" (featuring Rihanna and Bryson Tiller) (co-produced with DJ Nasty & LVM)

PartyNextDoor – COLOURS 2
01. "Peace of Mind" (produced with G. Ry and OZ)
02. "Freak In You" (produced with G. Ry, Neenyo, 40 and Top FLR)
03. "Low Battery" (produced with G. Ry, Top FLR and M3rge)
04. "Rendezvous" (produced with G. Ry and Wallis Lane)

PartyNextDoor – Seven Days
01. "Bad Intentions"
06. "The Right Brathwaite Again" (co-produced by Andrew Watt)

2018
Post Malone - Beerbongs & Bentleys
05. "Takin' Shots"

2020
PARTYNEXTDOOR - Partymobile
01. "NOTHING LESS"

PARTYNEXTDOOR - PartyPack
02. "West District" (co-produced by 40)
04. "Candy" (featuring Nipsey Hussle)

Songwriting credits

Notes

References

Hip hop discographies
Discographies of Canadian artists